In the Shadow of the Raven (Icelandic: Í skugga hrafnsins) is the title of a 1988 film by Hrafn Gunnlaugsson, set in Viking Age Iceland. The film was selected as the Icelandic entry for the Best Foreign Language Film at the 61st Academy Awards, but was not accepted as a nominee.

In the Shadow of the Raven is the second film of the Raven Trilogy (also known as the Viking Trilogy) that consists of three 'Viking' films:

 1) When the Raven Flies (1984) – (original Icelandic title: Hrafninn flýgur) – usually known as simply The Raven or Revenge of the Barbarians.
 2) In The Shadow of the Raven (1988) – (original Icelandic title: Í skugga hrafnsins).
 3) Embla (2007) – (original Icelandic title: Hvíti víkingurinn) – the director's cut of The White Viking.

Plot
The film is a loose re-telling of the legend of Tristan and Isolde. In the year 1077, Trausti returns to Iceland after having studied theology in Norway. Meanwhile, Grim, the foreman on Trausti's farm, discovers a stranded whale. However, the retainers of the cruel neighbouring chief Eirikur discovers the whale as well. As Grim brings Trausti's mother Edda, the chief of the area, they discover Eirikur attempting to steal the whale. A fight erupts between the different clans and Edda is killed in the struggle. Grim kills Eirikur in revenge, and a blood-feud between Trausti's clan and Eirikur's clan is imminent.

Cast
 Reine Brynolfsson as Trausti
 Tinna Gunnlaugsdóttir as Isold
 Egill Ólafsson as Hjörleifur
 Sune Mangs ad Bishop Hördur
 Kristbjörg Kjeld as Sigrid, The Shrew
 Helgi Skúlason as Grim
 Klara Íris Vigfúsdóttir as Sol
 Helga Bachmann as Edda
 Johann Neumann as Leonardo, The Artist
 Sveinn M. Eiðsson as Ketill
 Flosi Ólafsson as Eirikur
 Sigurður Sigurjónsson as Egill

Noomi Rapace made her debut as uncredited extra at the wedding scene.

Critical response

In 1991, the Washington Post published a positive review of the film, critic Jeanne Cooper noting Hrafn Gunnlaugsson reaches gripping heights. The reviewer noted that the character of the bishop came off as similar to Jabba the Hutt and that Trausti's survival ability came off a Rasputin-like, but noted that this did not detract from the film. New York Times wrote in their own review the same year that "In the world of Hrafn Gunnlaugsson's medieval adventure film, The Shadow of the Raven, emotions are as jagged and windblown as the spectacular Icelandic coastline where the movie was shot". Critic Stephen Holden praised the performances of Tinna Gunnlaugsdóttir and Kristbjörg Kjeld, but panned Reine Brynolfsson as unconvincing. Holden described Sune Mang's performance as "glowering exuberance", but was critical to some of dialog delivery of the cast members, calling it "grunting".

Connections to The Raven Flies

Though not a conventional sequel at first sight, the film does feature several nods to the original film. The farm Króss is shot at the very same location as Thord's farm in the original film. When Trausti opens up his father's tomb, it's the very same clifftomb featured in The Raven Flies and the father's old helmet and cape and idols of Odin and Thor are the same as in the original film. Also, Gest's throwing knives are also found in the tomb. This heavily suggest that Trausti is the descendant of Thord and Einar.

See also
 List of submissions to the 61st Academy Awards for Best Foreign Language Film
 List of Icelandic submissions for the Academy Award for Best Foreign Language Film

References

External links 
 
 
 
 Í skugga hrafnsins at Kvìkmyndír

1988 films
1988 action films
Swedish epic films
Films based on Norse mythology
Films directed by Hrafn Gunnlaugsson
Films set in Iceland
Films set in the Viking Age
Icelandic drama films
1980s Icelandic-language films